The Gongshan muntjac (Muntiacus gongshanensis) is a species of muntjac (a type of deer) living in the Gongshan mountains in northwestern Yunnan, southeast Tibet, Northeast India (especially in Arunachal Pradesh) and northern Myanmar. 

Ongoing hunting is a major threat to its survival. While the population cannot be accurately counted, they are often seen on camera-trapping studies which suggest a population well above being endangered. Gongshan Muntjacs have been observed within two large protected areas in Myanmar, Khakaborazi National Park and the Hponkanrazi Wildlife Sanctuary.

Genetic studies have shown it to be very closely related to the hairy-fronted muntjac, possibly close enough to be considered the same species despite different coloration, though this position is disputed.  References of occurrence of the hairy-fronted muntjac Muntiacus crinifrons in Arunachal Pradesh are actually Gongshan muntjac.

References

Muntjac
Mammals of Myanmar
Mammals of China
Mammals of India
Fauna of Yunnan
Mammals described in 1990